Mirabilis laevis, the desert wishbone-bush, is a recently redefined species of flowering plant in the four o'clock family. Distribution is in the Southwestern United States and northwest Mexico.

Distribution and taxonomy
Mirabilis laevis now includes the common California chaparral plant known as wishbone bush (formerly Mirabilis californica), and several very similar relatives previously classified as separate species and now as varieties.

Varieties
Mirabilis laevis var. crassifolia is found in California chaparral and woodlands habitats in California and Baja California, including Cedros Island (namesake for synonym M. c. (A. Gray) var. cedrosensis (Standl.) J.F. Macbr.).  The plant is also found in the Southern California Coast Ranges, Sierra Nevada foothills, Transverse Ranges, Peninsular Ranges, the White Mountains, and the Inyo Mountains.
Mirabilis laevis var. retrorsa is found in the White and Inyo Mountains, Nevada, and Oregon, east to Utah, and south to Arizona and northwest Mexico.
Mirabilis laevis var. villosa has a similar distribution to Mirabilis laevis var. retrorsa.

References

Spellenberg, R. & S. R. Rodriguez Tijerina. (2001). Geographic variation and taxonomy of North American species of Mirabilis, section Oxybaphoides (Nyctaginaceae). Sida 19:3 539–570.

External links

Jepson Herbarium—Jepson Flora Project: Mirabilis laevis 
USDA Plants Profile

laevis
Flora of Arizona
Flora of California
Flora of Oregon
Flora of Nevada
Flora of Utah
Flora of the Sierra Nevada (United States)
Flora of Northwestern Mexico
Flora of Oaxaca
Flora of the Sonoran Deserts
Flora of the California desert regions
Night-blooming plants
Flora without expected TNC conservation status